The Kotaneelee Formation is a stratigraphical unit of Late Cretaceous age in the Western Canadian Sedimentary Basin. 

It takes the name from the Kotaneelee River, and was first described in outcrop in the river valley by C.O. Hage in 1945.

Lithology
The Kotaneelee Formation is composed of marine shale, sandstone, conglomerate.

Distribution
It occurs in outcrop along the Petitot River and Liard River valleys from the Beaver River to the Kotaneelee River mouth.

Relationship to other units

The Kotaneelee Formation is gradually overlain by the Wapiti Group and conformably overlays the Dunvegan Formation.

It is equivalent to the Wapiabi Formation in Alberta.

References

Stratigraphy of British Columbia
Stratigraphy of the Northwest Territories